Hildur Andersen (25 May 1864 – 20 December 1956) was a Norwegian pianist and music pedagogue.

She was born in Christiania to stadsingeniør Oluf Martin Andersen and Annette Fredrikke Sontum, and was a sister of geographer Aksel Arstal. She made her consert debut in Kristiania in 1886. She is known both as a concert pianist and for her music lectures. She had a close friendship with playwright Henrik Ibsen, and is regarded to be the model for the character "Hilde Wangel" in Ibsen's play The Master Builder. She was awarded the King's Medal of Merit in gold in 1924.

References

1864 births
1956 deaths
Musicians from Oslo
Norwegian classical pianists
19th-century Norwegian pianists
20th-century Norwegian pianists
Recipients of the King's Medal of Merit in gold